Emil Varhaugvik Breivik (born 11 June 2000) is a Norwegian footballer who plays as a midfielder for Norwegian club Molde.

Club career
Breivik got his debut for Molde 2 on 3 October 2016 in a 2–5 loss away to Rosenborg 2. He made his debut for the first team on 1 May 2019 when he came in as a 62nd minute substitute in Molde's 5–0 win against Eide/Omegn in the Norwegian Cup first round.

Brevik spent the latter half of 2019 and entire 2020 on loan at Raufoss. Becoming a mainstay of the 1. divisjon team, he returned to Molde ahead of the 2021 season and made his debut as a starter in the Europa League Round of 16 game against Granada CF.

Career statistics

Club

Honours
Eliteserien: 2022
Norwegian Cup: 2021–22

References

External links 
 Molde FK profile 

2000 births
Living people
People from Aukra
Norwegian footballers
Molde FK players
Raufoss IL players
Norwegian First Division players

Association football midfielders
Sportspeople from Møre og Romsdal